Hübbe is a surname of Danish or German origin, which is properly Anglicized as Huebbe. Notable people with this surname include:

Edith Agnes Hübbe, born Edith Agnes Cook (1859–1942), pioneering educator in South Australia
Nikolaj Hübbe (born 1967), artistic director of the Royal Danish Ballet
Ulrich Hübbe (1805–1892), German emigrant to South Australia, associated with land titles reform

References